Didier Amevi Ahadsi (born 1970) is a Togolese self-taught artist and sculptor. His work is shown is various museums and art galleries worldwide. His inspiration ranges from voodoo religious practices, African traditions, modern influences, to a series of personal stories of daily life.

Biography 

Didier Ahadsi was born in Vogan, Togo. He belongs to the African ethnic group of Ewe people and he grew up with 3 half-brothers and four half-sisters. His environment was influenced by agriculture, voodoo cult and Christian religion.

As a young man Ahadsi started to work as a panel beater and welder. He repaired autobodies and later he combined his professional skills with his creativity and created metal figurines showing contemporary scenes of daily life in his living area in Lomé. With his work Ahadsi produced satirical, macabre, provocative and erotic scenes.

Ahadsi is inspired by African traditions, like Voodoo religious and he also does contract work.

Exhibitions

Bwoom Contemporary

Hannover Gallery

Indigo Arts Gallery

Museum für Völkerkunde Hamburg

Indigo Arts Gallery

Rautenstrauch Joest Museum

Museum der Völker

Literature 

 A4: Magazin für aussereuropäische Kunst und Kultur. no. 1, 2007, pages 98–101, xii. Schwaz, Tirol: Haus der Völker Kulturverein, Museum für Kunst und Ethnografie

References 

1970 births
Togolese artists
People from Lomé
Living people
21st-century Togolese people